Alfred Dillon (1841 – 13 November 1915) was a Liberal Party Member of Parliament in New Zealand. Historian David Hamer remarked that Dillon was the prime example of a "Seddonian" Liberal politician, due to humble, rustic background and appeal as a "man of the people".

Biography

Early life
Dillon was from humble origins in Wales before moving to New Zealand in 1857. A poor speaker and sneered at by William Russell as illiterate, he appealed as a "man of the people" who had made his way by his own efforts. He retained the image of the rugged pioneer; short, barrel-chested, bushy-bearded and usually clad in thick country tweeds.

Political career

Dillon won the Hawkes Bay electorate in 1905, beating the oligarchical Leader of the Opposition William Russell, but was defeated six years later in 1911. He was 64 years old when he entered Parliament and was known affectionately as "Dad" by other Liberal members.

Notes

References

1841 births
1915 deaths
New Zealand Liberal Party MPs
New Zealand farmers
New Zealand people of Welsh descent